Mutation Frequency Decline (mfd) is the gene which encodes the protein Mfd (also known as Transcription Repair Coupling Factor, TRCF). Mfd functions in transcription-coupled repair to remove a stalled RNA polymerase that has encountered DNA damage and is unable to continue translocating.

About 
Mfd utilizes ATP to translocate along DNA, most likely forcing RNA polymerase forward and ultimately dissociating it from the DNA template.  Mfd also contains binding domains which recruit UvrA and trigger the associated nucleotide excision repair pathway and was initially discovered when its mutation led to a decrease in mutation rates after irradiation by UV light. Structural studies of E. coli Mfd by X-ray crystallography have revealed that this molecule is autoinhibited for UvrA-binding in its apo form due to a "clamp" interaction between the N-terminal UvrB-homology module and the C-terminal domain.

In 2002, it was shown that Mfd may also re-initiate transcription at backtracked RNAP by forcing the polymerase forward and out of its backtracked state.

In 2015, Merrikh Lab at University of Washington discovered the bacterial protein called Mutation Frequency Decline (Mfd) quickens the bacterial mutation process. This work researches ways to slow the rate of bacterial mutations and to block their evolution, in order to fight against antibiotic resistance.

References 

Mutation